Sama is the surname of:

 Balkrishna Sama (1903–1981), Nepalese dramatist
 Catherine M. Sama, professor of Italian at the University of Rhode Island
 Koffi Sama (born 1944), Prime Minister of Togo from 2002 to 2005
 Logan Sama, English Grime DJ from Brentwood, Essex
 Mustapha Sama (born 1979), Sierra Leonean football player
 S. K. Sama (born 1934), Indian gastroenterologist
 Serukalathur Sama, a Tamil film actor
 Stephen Sama (born 1993), Cameroon born German footballer